Theodore A. Glynn (November 8, 1881 – February 6, 1950) was an American politician who served as clerk of the Roxbury District Court and commissioner of the Boston Fire Department. He was a candidate for mayor of Boston in 1925.

Early life
Glynn was born on November 8, 1881 in Boston's Roxbury neighborhood. His parents died when he was young and he began working as a grocery store delivery boy after graduating from grammar school. He later opened his own market. He then worked for the Cudahy Packing Company, where he rose to the position of general manager. In 1906 he married Anna Cooney. They had two children, one of whom, Theodore A. Glynn Jr. served as a state representative and state court judge. Anna Glynn died in 1936.

Political career
In 1903, the 21 year old Glynn was elected to the Boston Common Council. In 1905 he defeated former state senator Thomas F. Curley a seat in the Massachusetts House of Representatives. Curley's defeat was a setback for the Boston Tammany Club, run by Thomas F. Curley and James Michael Curley, however Glynn joined the organization a few years later and became its president. Glynn managed James Michael Curley's campaigns in the 1914, 1917, and 1921 mayoral elections. On July 29, 1922 he was appointed Boston Fire Commissioner by Mayor Curley. Curley was ineligible to run in 1925 and Glynn ran to succeed him. Glynn finished second in the ten-candidate race. A large number of votes were split between Glynn the other Democratic candidates, which resulted in the election of Republican Malcolm Nichols. Nicholas replaced Glynn as Fire Commissioner in 1926. Glynn was a candidate for mayor again in 1929, however he dropped out of the race and backed James Michael Curley. In April 1932, Curley appointed Glynn to the position of street commissioner. In 1934, Curley, who had become Governor, named Glynn clerk of the Roxbury District Court. Glynn held this position until his death on February 6, 1950.

References

1881 births
1950 deaths
20th-century American politicians
Commissioners of the Boston Fire Department
Democratic Party members of the Massachusetts House of Representatives
Politicians from Boston